

Historical and architectural interest bridges

Major bridges

Notes and References 
 Notes

 

 

 Others references

See also 

 Cầu khỉ ("monkey bridge")
 Transport in Vietnam
 Rail transport in Vietnam
 Expressways of Vietnam
 List of crossings of the Mekong River

External links

Further reading 
 
 

Vietnam
 
Bridges
Bridges